Stenodyneriellus is an Australasian and Indomalayan genus of potter wasps.

Species
The following species are included within the genus Stenodyneriellus:

Stenodyneriellus apicatimimus Giordani Soika, 1996
Stenodyneriellus arnemlandicus (Borsato, 1994)
Stenodyneriellus auricomus Gusenleitner, 2008
Stenodyneriellus bannensis (Schulthess, 1934)
Stenodyneriellus bicoloratus (Saussure, 1856)
Stenodyneriellus birostratus Giordani Soika, 1994
Stenodyneriellus boholensis (Schulthess, 1934)
Stenodyneriellus brisbanensis Giordani Soika, 1961
Stenodyneriellus carinicollis (Cameron, 1903)
Stenodyneriellus carnarvonensis Giordani Soika, 1977
Stenodyneriellus celebensis Giordani Soika, 1994
Stenodyneriellus cilicioides Giordani Soika, 1994
Stenodyneriellus cilicius Cameron, 1902
Stenodyneriellus clypearis Giordani Soika, 1995
Stenodyneriellus convexus Giordani Soika, 1995
Stenodyneriellus darnleyensis Giordani Soika, 1977
Stenodyneriellus duplostrigatus (von Schulthess, 1934)
Stenodyneriellus facilis (Smith, 1861)
Stenodyneriellus fistulosus (Saussure, 1867)
Stenodyneriellus flaviventris Giordani Soika, 1995
Stenodyneriellus flavobalteatus (Cameron, 1903)
Stenodyneriellus flavoclypeatus Giordani Soika, 1994  
Stenodyneriellus guttulatus (Saussure, 1862)
Stenodyneriellus heterospilus (Cameron, 1907)
Stenodyneriellus hewittii (Cameron, 1907)
Stenodyneriellus indicus Gusenleitner, 1997
Stenodyneriellus insularis Smith, 1859
Stenodyneriellus iriensis Giordani Soika, 1995
Stenodyneriellus laevis Giordani Soika, 1995
Stenodyneriellus lepidus Borsato, 1995
Stenodyneriellus longithorax Giordani Soika, 1994
Stenodyneriellus montanus Giordani Soika, 1995
Stenodyneriellus multimaculatus Giordani Soika, 1993
Stenodyneriellus multipictus (Smith, 1858)
Stenodyneriellus nigriculus Giordani Soika, 1995
Stenodyneriellus nitidissimus Giordani Soika, 1995
Stenodyneriellus nitidus Giordani Soika, 1995
Stenodyneriellus novempunctatus Giordani Soika, 1977
Stenodyneriellus octolineatus Giordani Soika, 1995
Stenodyneriellus perpunctatus Giordani Soika, 1994
Stenodyneriellus plurinotatus Giordani Soika, 1995
Stenodyneriellus praeclusus (Nurse, 1903)
Stenodyneriellus pseudancistrocerus (Giordani Soika, 1961)
Stenodyneriellus pseudoplanus Giordani Soika, 1995
Stenodyneriellus punctatissimus Giordani Soika, 1977
Stenodyneriellus punctulatus Giordani Soika, 1995
Stenodyneriellus rubroclypeatus Giordani Soika, 1994
Stenodyneriellus rufinodus Giordani Soika, 1995
Stenodyneriellus sequestratus (Nurse, 1903)
Stenodyneriellus soikai Borsato, 2003
Stenodyneriellus spinosiusculus Giordani Soika, 1961
Stenodyneriellus sublamellatus Giordani Soika, 1994
Stenodyneriellus tegularis Giordani Soika, 1994
Stenodyneriellus tricoloratus Gusenleitner, 1996
Stenodyneriellus trimaculatus Giordani Soika, 1988
Stenodyneriellus turneriellus Giordani Soika, 1961
Stenodyneriellus wickwari (Meade-Waldo, 1911)
Stenodyneriellus yanchepensis (Giordani Soika, 1961)
Stenodyneriellus unipunctatus Giordani Soika, 1995

References

Hymenoptera genera
Potter wasps